End of Communism in 1989 may refer to:

 Revolutions of 1989
 End of Communism in Bulgaria (1989)
 End of Communism in Hungary (1989)
 End of Communism in Poland (1989)
 Fall of the Berlin Wall
 Romanian Revolution
 Velvet Revolution